Nicole Hudson (born November 11, 1990) is an American softball player. She grew up in Webb City, Missouri, where her father owned a pizzeria, and attended Webb City High School, where she played softball and basketball. She later attended the University of Missouri, where she played third base and pitcher on the Missouri Tigers softball team. During her freshman season in 2010, Hudson led the Tigers to the 2010 Women's College World Series first round, where they fell to Florida, 5–0. During her sophomore season in 2011, Hudson led the Tigers to the 2011 Women's College World Series second round, where they fell to Baylor, 1–0.

References

External links
 
Missouri bio
Wichita State bio
USA Softball Bio

1990 births
Softball players from Missouri
Living people
People from Webb City, Missouri
Missouri Tigers softball players
Wichita State Shockers softball coaches